Richland Township is one of nine townships in Whitley County, Indiana, United States. As of the 2010 census, its population was 1,758 and it contained 712 housing units.

Geography
Lakes in this township include Black Lake, Compton Lake, Ice House Lake, Larwill Lake, Little Wilson Lake, Menzie Lake, Souder Lake and Wilson Lake. The streams of Betzner Branch, Ford Branch, Jones Branch, Kaler Branch and King Branch run through this township.

Cities and towns
 Larwill

Adjacent townships
 Etna-Troy Township (north)
 Thorncreek Township (northeast)
 Columbia Township (east)
 Cleveland Township (south)
 Jackson Township, Kosciusko County (southwest)
 Monroe Township, Kosciusko County (west)
 Washington Township, Kosciusko County (northwest)

Cemeteries
The township contains two cemeteries: Lakeview and Richland Center.

Major highways
  U.S. Route 30
  Indiana State Road 5

Education
Richland Township residents may obtain a free library card from the South Whitley Community Public Library.

References
 U.S. Board on Geographic Names (GNIS)
 United States Census Bureau cartographic boundary files

External links
 Indiana Township Association
 United Township Association of Indiana

Townships in Whitley County, Indiana
Townships in Indiana